John Jack (9 March 1932 – 22 October 1988) was a Scottish footballer who played for Celtic and Morton.

At Celtic, where he spent nine years, he was mainly a reserve behind Jim Mallan, Alec Boden and Jock Stein, with Bobby Evans also being asked to fill in rather than calling upon the inexperienced Jack even in minor competitions. However he did feature regularly in the 1956–57 season, during which he won the Scottish League Cup with the Hoops overcoming Partick Thistle in the final after a replay to win that competition for the first time. When Stein retired and took over the reserve team, Jack assisted until he departed in 1959, spending a short period with Morton.

Born Jonas Kaduskevieche, he was one of four Scots of Lithuanian descent to play for the club between the 1930s and 1960s, all of them defenders, the most famous being Billy McNeill who joined as a teenager in 1957 and quickly overtook Jack in the queue for team selection.

References

1932 births
1988 deaths
Footballers from Bellshill
Association football central defenders
Scottish people of Lithuanian descent
Scottish footballers
Celtic F.C. players
Greenock Morton F.C. players
Stonehouse Violet F.C. players
Scottish Football League players
Scottish Junior Football Association players